Grade 1 may refer to:
 
First grade, the first school year of primary education.
A Grade 1 Graded stakes race horse race 
Grade One (TV series), a 2014 Chinese TV variety show
Grade 1 listed building, UK heritage designation